Pterospermum reticulatum is a species of flowering plant in the family Malvaceae. It is found only in India. It is threatened by habitat loss.

References

reticulatum
Vulnerable plants
Taxonomy articles created by Polbot